Empress Liu (personal name unknown) (died  693), formally Empress Sumingshunsheng (literally "the solemn, understanding, serene, and holy empress") or Empress Suming in short, was an empress of the Chinese Tang Dynasty.  She was the wife of Emperor Ruizong.

Background 
It is not known when the future Empress Liu was born.  Her grandfather Liu Dewei (劉德威) had served as the minister of justice and her father Liu Yanjing (劉延景) as a prefect.  During the Emperor Gaozong's Yifeng era (676–679), Emperor Gaozong's son Li Dan, who was then an imperial prince, took her initially as a concubine, and then as his wife and princess. She bore him three children—a son named Li Chengqi, and two daughters (the later Princesses Shouchang and Dai).

As empress 
As of 684, Emperor Gaozong had died and his son Li Zhe (Li Dan's older brother) had become emperor (as Emperor Zhongzong).  In spring 684, Emperor Zhongzong showed signs of independence from his (and Li Dan's) mother Empress Dowager Wu (later known as Wu Zetian), who wielded most of the imperial power, and she deposed Emperor Zhongzong, replacing him with Li Dan (as Emperor Ruizong), but held power even more securely after that point.  As Emperor Ruizong's wife, Princess Liu was created empress, and her son Li Chengqi was created crown prince.

In 690, Empress Dowager Wu forced Emperor Ruizong to yield the throne to her, and she took the throne as "emperor" of a new Zhou Dynasty, interrupting Tang Dynasty.  She created Li Dan crown prince instead (with the unconventional title Huangsi (皇嗣)), and further changed his name to Wu Dan.  Empress Liu became crown princess.

Death 
In 693, one of Wu Zetian's trusted ladies in waiting, Wei Tuan'er (韋團兒), was, for reasons lost to history, said to be resentful of Wu Dan.  To attack him, she decided to first falsely accuse Crown Princess Liu and one of Wu Dan's concubines, Consort Dou, of witchcraft.  On an occasion when both Crown Princess Liu and Consort Dou were in the palace to greet Wu Zetian, Wu Zetian waited until they left her presence, and then sent assassins to kill them. Their bodies were buried inside the palace, and the location was kept secret.  Wu Dan, fearful of what his mother might do next, said nothing of the loss of his wife and concubine. When Wei Tuan'er considered further falsely accusing Wu Dan, her plans were leaked to Wu Zetian, and Wu Zetian executed her.

In 710, Wu Dan (whose name had been restored to Li Dan by that point after Tang Dynasty's restoration in 705 under Emperor Zhongzong, who was restored that year) became emperor after Emperor Zhongzong's death.  He honored Empress Liu as Empress Suming and Consort Dou (whose son Li Longji (the later Emperor Xuanzong) had been made the Prince of Shouchun) as Empress Zhaocheng, and he sought to locate their bodies for reburial, but could not locate them.  He therefore carried out ceremonies where their spirits were summoned to caskets to be buried at an imperial tomb.  After Emperor Ruizong's own death in 716, on account of Emperor Xuanzong's desire to honor his mother Consort Dou, Empress Liu was initially not worshipped together with Emperor Ruizong at the imperial ancestral temple, but eventually was, in 732.

References 
 Old Book of Tang, vol. 51.
 New Book of Tang, 76.
 Zizhi Tongjian, vols. 203, 205.

Tang dynasty empresses
7th-century births
693 deaths
7th-century Chinese women
7th-century Chinese people